Marguerite III de Neufchâtel, (1480-1544), was a German-Roman monarch as Princess Abbess of the Imperial Remiremont Abbey in France. She ruled from 1528 to 1544.

References
   Worldwide Guide to Women in Leadership. Women in power

1480 births
1544 deaths
Abbesses of Remiremont